Bakerella is the scientific name of two genera of organisms and may refer to:
 Bakerella, a plant genus in the family Loranthaceae
 Bakerella, a planthopper genus in the family Delphacidae